The Torneo Clausura 2008 (official name: Copa Tigo 2008) is the football (soccer) tournament that closes the season in the Paraguayan first division.

The tournament began on July 25 with the participation of 12 teams, playing a two-legged all play all system. In the end, Libertad won the tournament, securing a spot for the Copa Libertadores 2009.

Standings

Results

{|class="wikitable" style="text-align:center; float:left; margin-right:1em;"
|- 
!colspan=3 |Matchday 1
|- 
!width="150"|Home Team
!width="75"|Result
!width="150"|Away Team

{|class="wikitable" style="text-align:center; float:left; margin-right:1em;"
|- 
!colspan=3 |Matchday 2
|- 
!width="150"|Home Team
!width="75"|Result
!width="150"|Away Team

{|class="wikitable" style="text-align:center; float:left; margin-right:1em;"
|- 
!colspan=3 |Matchday 3
|- 
!width="150"|Home Team
!width="75"|Result
!width="150"|Away Team

{|class="wikitable" style="text-align:center; float:left; margin-right:1em;"
|- 
!colspan=3 |Matchday 4
|- 
!width="150"|Home Team
!width="75"|Result
!width="150"|Away Team

{|class="wikitable" style="text-align:center; float:left; margin-right:1em;"
|- 
!colspan=3 |Matchday 5
|- 
!width="150"|Home Team
!width="75"|Result
!width="150"|Away Team

{|class="wikitable" style="text-align:center; float:left; margin-right:1em;"
|- 
!colspan=3 |Matchday 6
|- 
!width="150"|Home Team
!width="75"|Result
!width="150"|Away Team

{|class="wikitable" style="text-align:center; float:left; margin-right:1em;"
|- 
!colspan=3 |Matchday 7
|- 
!width="150"|Home Team
!width="75"|Result
!width="150"|Away Team

{|class="wikitable" style="text-align:center; float:left; margin-right:1em;"
|- 
!colspan=3 |Matchday 8
|- 
!width="150"|Home Team
!width="75"|Result
!width="150"|Away Team

{|class="wikitable" style="text-align:center; float:left; margin-right:1em;"
|- 
!colspan=3 |Matchday 9
|- 
!width="150"|Home Team
!width="75"|Result
!width="150"|Away Team

{|class="wikitable" style="text-align:center; float:left; margin-right:1em;"
|- 
!colspan=3 |Matchday 10
|- 
!width="150"|Home Team
!width="75"|Result
!width="150"|Away Team

{|class="wikitable" style="text-align:center; float:left; margin-right:1em;"
|- 
!colspan=3 |Matchday 11
|- 
!width="150"|Home Team
!width="75"|Result
!width="150"|Away Team

{|class="wikitable" style="text-align:center; float:left; margin-right:1em;"
|- 
!colspan=3 |Matchday 12
|- 
!width="150"|Home Team
!width="75"|Result
!width="150"|Away Team

{|class="wikitable" style="text-align:center; float:left; margin-right:1em;"
|- 
!colspan=3 |Matchday 13
|- 
!width="150"|Home Team
!width="75"|Result
!width="150"|Away Team

{|class="wikitable" style="text-align:center; float:left; margin-right:1em;"
|- 
!colspan=3 |Matchday 14
|- 
!width="150"|Home Team
!width="75"|Result
!width="150"|Away Team
|-

{|class="wikitable" style="text-align:center; float:left; margin-right:1em;"
|- 
!colspan=3 |Matchday 15
|- 
!width="150"|Home Team
!width="75"|Result
!width="150"|Away Team

{|class="wikitable" style="text-align:center; float:left; margin-right:1em;"
|- 
!colspan=3 |Matchday 16
|- 
!width="150"|Home Team
!width="75"|Result
!width="150"|Away Team

{|class="wikitable" style="text-align:center; float:left; margin-right:1em;"
|- 
!colspan=3 |Matchday 17
|- 
!width="150"|Home Team
!width="75"|Result
!width="150"|Away Team

{|class="wikitable" style="text-align:center; float:left; margin-right:1em;"
|- 
!colspan=3 |Matchday 18
|- 
!width="150"|Home Team
!width="75"|Result
!width="150"|Away Team
|-

{|class="wikitable" style="text-align:center; float:left; margin-right:1em;"
|- 
!colspan=3 |Matchday 19
|- 
!width="150"|Home Team
!width="75"|Result
!width="150"|Away Team
|-

{|class="wikitable" style="text-align:center; float:left; margin-right:1em;"
|- 
!colspan=3 |Matchday 20
|- 
!width="150"|Home Team
!width="75"|Result
!width="150"|Away Team

{|class="wikitable" style="text-align:center; float:left; margin-right:1em;"
|- 
!colspan=3 |Matchday 21
|- 
!width="150"|Home Team
!width="75"|Result
!width="150"|Away Team

{|class="wikitable" style="text-align:center; float:left; margin-right:1em;"
|- 
!colspan=3 |Matchday 22
|- 
!width="150"|Home Team
!width="75"|Result
!width="150"|Away Team

Top scorers

Last Updated: December 24, 2008

References

External links 
 Asociación Paraguaya de Fútbol Website
 Paraguay 2008 by Eli Schmerler and Juan Pablo Andrés at RSSSF

Clausura